The Uganda Free Zones Authority (UFZA) is a government free zones agency established by the Parliament of Uganda. Operating under the Ministry of Finance, Planning and Economic Development, UFZA is responsible for the establishment, development, management, marketing, maintenance, supervision and control of free zones in Uganda and to provide for other related matters.

Location
The headquarters of UFZA is located on 6th Floor, Communications House, Plot 1 Colville Street, in central Kampala. The coordinates of the head office are: 0° 18' 48.6"N, 32° 35' 3.48"E (Latitude: 0.3135; Longitude: 32.5843).

Overview
UFZA was created by the Ugandan Parliament in 2014 for the establishment, development, management, marketing, maintenance, supervision and control of free zones and other related matters. UFZA works with the government and the private sector to promote the economic growth of Uganda through export oriented investments and infrastructure development.

Administration
In July 2014, Ugandan Finance Minister Maria Kiwanuka appointed economist and private sector development professional Richard Jabo as UFZA’s first executive director on a five year term.

See also
Free economic zone
Economy of Uganda

References

External links 

Government agencies of Uganda
Economy of Uganda
Special economic zones
Government agencies established in 2014
Organisations based in Kampala
2014 establishments in Uganda
Government finances in Uganda
Finance in Uganda
Investment promotion agencies